The 1960 Texas gubernatorial election was held on November 8, 1960, to elect the governor of Texas. Incumbent Democratic Governor Price Daniel was easily reelected to a third term, winning 73% of the vote to Republican William Steger's 27%.

Primaries

Democratic

Results

References

1960
Texas
November 1960 events in the United States
1960 Texas elections